Bryn Andrew Morris (born 25 April 1996) is an English professional footballer who plays as a defensive midfielder or centre back for EFL League Two club Grimsby Town. 

He has played in the English Football League for Middlesbrough, Coventry City, York City, Walsall, Shrewsbury Town, Wycombe Wanderers, Portsmouth, Northampton Town, Burton Albion and Hartlepool United.

Early and personal life
Born in Hartlepool, County Durham, Morris attended the High Tunstall College of Science. In April 2014, he was awarded the sporting achievement award at the Hartlepool Mail's Pride of Hartlepool ceremony.

Club career

Middlesbrough
Morris began his career at Middlesbrough, having joined the club when he was eleven and made progress through the academy. He made his first-team debut on 5 January 2013 in an FA Cup tie away to Hastings United, a match that Middlesbrough won 4–1. He made his league debut on 4 May in a 2–0 defeat away to Sheffield Wednesday. Two months after making his debut, Morris signed his first professional contract with the club, which would keep him until 2016.

On 21 November 2014, Morris signed for League Two club Burton Albion on a one-month loan. One day later, Morris made his debut, where he came on as a substitute for Adam McGurk, in a 1–0 victory over Luton Town. His impressive displays at Burton Albion prompted manager Jimmy Floyd Hasselbaink to tip him for greatness. On 13 December 2014, Morris provided an assist for Shane Cansdell-Sherriff to score the third goal in a 4–0 win over Hartlepool United. Despite Burton being keen to extend the loan it never materialised, and Morris returned to Middlesbrough, having made five appearances for Burton Albion.

On 6 August 2015, Morris signed for Coventry City on a season-long loan, linking up again with Tony Mowbray, the manager under whom he had made his professional debut. He made six appearances, the last coming against Rochdale, for Coventry before being recalled by Middlesbrough on 26 October 2015.

On 27 October 2015, Morris signed for League Two club York City on a one-month loan. On 28 January 2016, Morris signed for League One club Walsall on a two-month loan.

Shrewsbury Town
Morris was released from his Middlesbrough contract in order to join League One club Shrewsbury Town on 20 January 2017 on a contract until the end of 2016–17. He made his debut for the club the following day, as an 88th-minute substitute in a 1–0 home victory over Oldham Athletic. After featuring regularly to help the club escape relegation, he signed a two-year contract extension in June 2017.

Morris joined Shrewsbury's League One rivals Wycombe Wanderers on 7 August 2018 on loan until 3 January 2019.

Portsmouth
Morris signed for League One club Portsmouth on 14 January 2019 on a two-and-a-half-year contract for an undisclosed fee. He scored his first goal for Portsmouth in a 3–3 draw against Southend United on 16 February 2019. Morris was cup-tied for Portsmouth's win in the 2019 EFL Trophy Final.

On 18 January 2021, Morris signed for Northampton Town on a loan deal until the end of the season.

Burton Albion
Following his release from Portsmouth, Morris signed for League One side Burton Albion in June 2021. With his game time at Burton limited, Morris joined his hometown club Hartlepool United on loan on 31 January 2022. He made his debut for Pools in an FA Cup fourth round defeat away to Crystal Palace.

Grimsby Town
On 15 July 2022, Morris signed for Grimsby Town on a one-year deal.

International career
Morris has represented England at under-16, under-17, under-18, and under-19 levels, captaining the team at each level.

Career statistics

Honours
Shrewsbury Town
EFL Trophy runner-up: 2017–18

References

External links
Profile at the Portsmouth F.C. website

1996 births
Living people
Footballers from Hartlepool
English footballers
England youth international footballers
Association football defenders
Association football midfielders
Middlesbrough F.C. players
Burton Albion F.C. players
Coventry City F.C. players
York City F.C. players
Walsall F.C. players
Shrewsbury Town F.C. players
Wycombe Wanderers F.C. players
Portsmouth F.C. players
Northampton Town F.C. players
Hartlepool United F.C. players
Grimsby Town F.C. players
English Football League players